Pediasia rotundiprojecta is a moth in the family Crambidae. It was described by W. Li and H. Li in 2011. It is found in China (Tibet).

References

Crambini
Moths described in 2011
Moths of Asia